Venadillo is a town and municipality in the Tolima department of Colombia.  The population of the municipality was 15,128 as of the 1993 census.

Notable people
José William Aranguren (1935-1964), serial killer; was killed in Venadillo
Pedro A. López (born 1948; possibly deceased), serial killer; born in Venadillo

Municipalities of Tolima Department